Chararica hystriculella is a species of snout moth in the genus Chararica. It was described by George Duryea Hulst in 1889. It is found in the US states of Texas and southern Florida.

References

Moths described in 1889
Phycitinae